The Naples Historical Society's Historic Palm Cottage (also known as the Henry Watterson Cottage or The Cement Cottage, The Parmer Home, or Hamilton House) is a historic home in Naples, Florida. It is located in the Naples Historic District.

The antiques filled cottage, is a rare example of tabby mortar construction. The Historic Palm Cottage is Naples oldest house (1895) and is proudly maintained by the Naples Historical Society and is located at 137 12th Avenue South,(at Gulfshore Blvd.) a block East of Naples Pier. On May 24, 1982, it was added to the U.S. National Register of Historic Places.

It was the summer cottage of the Louisville, Ky Courier Journal and Times then owner/editor, Walter N. Haldeman.  Other Louisvillians owned homes in the area in this era.

The house is owned and operated as a museum by the Naples Historical Society.  The house has been decorated to reflect the early 1900s, and include the adjacent Norris Gardens, which feature five distinct themed areas and both the garden and house are open for docent guided tours Tuesdays through Saturdays from 1:00 p.m. to 4:00 p.m. 
More information at: http://www.napleshistoricalsociety.org/

References and external links

 Collier County listings at National Register of Historic Places
 Florida's Office of Cultural and Historical Programs
 Collier County listings
 Palm Cottage
 Famous Floridians of Naples
 A History Of Palm Cottage

External links
 Naples Historical Society -  official site, tours of the Historic Palm Cottage

Houses on the National Register of Historic Places in Florida
National Register of Historic Places in Collier County, Florida
Museums in Collier County, Florida
Historic house museums in Florida
Historical society museums in Florida
Buildings and structures in Naples, Florida
Vernacular architecture in Florida
Tabby buildings
Houses in Collier County, Florida